Héliopolis, Algeria  is a town and commune in Guelma Province, Algeria. According to the 1998 census it has a population of 22,605.

Name
The name of the town stems from the ancient Roman town on the same site. The name was derived from a famous circular Roman pool which had the effect of reflecting the sun, hence the name Heliopolis meaning in the ancient Greek language "City of the Sun".

Geography
The terrain around Héliopolis is mainly hilly, but the southeast is flat. The highest point in the vicinity is 426 meters above sea level, 1.9 km northeast of the Héliopolis. Around Héliopolis it is quite densely populated, with 129 inhabitants per square kilometers. Nearest society Guelma, 4.8 km south of Héliopolis. Around Héliopolis it is substantially densely. In the neighborhood around Héliopolis are unusually many named mountain.

Mediterranean climate prevails in the region. The average annual temperature in the area is 19 °C. The warmest month is July when the average temperature is 32 °C and the coldest is January, with 8 °C. Average annual rainfall is 677 millimeters. The rainiest month is February, with an average of 108 mm of precipitation, and the driest is July, with 9 mm of rainfall.

References

Communes of Guelma Province